is a waterfall in the Hachimantai district of Kazuno, Akita Prefecture, Japan, on the Yoakeshima branch of the Yoneshiro River. It is one of "Japan’s Top 100 Waterfalls", in a listing published by the Japanese Ministry of the Environment in 1990.
The falls have a height of 100 meters, making it one of the tallest on the list of 100 Waterfalls.  The falls are also one of the most remotely located on the listing, requiring a hike of 5.5 kilometers across very rough terrain to reach.

External links
  Ministry of Environment

Waterfalls of Japan
Landforms of Akita Prefecture
Tourist attractions in Akita Prefecture
Kazuno, Akita